Sir William Essex, 1st Baronet (c. 1575 – c. 1645), was an English politician  who sat in the House of Commons between 1597 and 1601.

Essex was the son of Thomas Essex, of Bewcot, Berkshire, by Joan Harrison, daughter of Thomas Harrison. He was a student of Christ Church, Oxford in 1587. In 1597 he was elected Member of Parliament for Arundel. He was elected MP for Stafford in 1601. He was a J.P. for Berkshire from 1601. In 1611 he was created a baronet, of Bewcot in the County of Berkshire. He managed to squander his substantial inheritance. During the Civil War he was in command of a parliamentary company of foot in a regiment commanded by his son, Charles Essex. Sir William was taken prisoner at the Battle of Edgehill in 1642 while his son was killed in action.
 
Essex died probably in 1645 and the baronetcy became extinct.

Essex married Jane Harcourt, daughter of Sir Walter Harcourt, of Stanton Harcourt, Oxfordshire in 1593, having obtained a licence by trickery while he was still in wardship.

References

English MPs 1597–1598
English MPs 1601
Baronets in the Baronetage of England
Members of the Parliament of England (pre-1707) for Stafford